Paul Litowsky (born April 17, 1995), known professionally as Paulie Litt, is an American actor and producer.  He is best known for his role as Justin Shanowski on the sitcom Hope & Faith.

Career
Litt was raised in Freehold Boro, New Jersey. He made his television debut on an episode of Third Watch.  In 2003, he was cast in the role of Justin Shanowski, Hope's son on the ABC sitcom Hope & Faith, which he played for all three seasons. At the time, Regis Philbin, who worked with his Hope & Faith co-star Kelly Ripa, described him as a forty-year old caught in a five-year old's body.  He had a recurring role in the Disney Channel series Wizards of Waverly Place.

In 2006, he was nominated for the award for the Best Performance in a TV series - Supporting Young Actor (Comedy) at the 27th Young Artist Awards for his performance on Hope & Faith, which was won by Angus T. Jones.  His co-stars Megan Fox and Macey Cruthird were also nominated for the female version of the award in 2005 and 2006 respectively.

He made his film debut in the 2004 Kevin Smith comedy Jersey Girl starring Ben Affleck.  In 2008, he played Spritle Racer in Speed Racer, as well as the accompanying video game. He also appeared in Doubt (2008).

He has appeared in over 26 commercials. Early in his career, he appeared in commercials for Oreos and ex-lax. He has been in Apple's "Get a Mac" television commercials as the 'Young PC' that starred John Hodgman and Justin Long.

He made his debut as a producer in the short film The Day I Finally Killed Myself as an Associate Producer.  He made his production debut in a feature film in 2016 in The Book of Love starring Jason Sudeikis.

Filmography

Television

Films

Video games

Producer

Awards

References

External links

1995 births
Living people
Male actors from New Jersey
American male child actors
People from Freehold Township, New Jersey
American male film actors
American male television actors